Quarter Turns over a Living Line is the debut studio album by the London-based duo Raime, consisting of Joe Andrews and Tom Halstead. The album was released on November 19, 2012, by the British label Blackest Ever Black.

The album differs from the band's previous works and the other albums of the genre in its use of live instruments, such as cello and drums. Quarter Turns over a Living Line was praised by music critics and appeared on various publications' lists of the best albums of the year. It allowed the band who was previously known in the underground circles to reach mainstream audience and gave Raime the opportunity to start touring and performing worldwide.

Recording
While working on the album, the duo separately from each other recorded a large amount of "sketches". Unlike their previous works and most other albums in the genre, on Quarter Turns over a Living Line they included the recordings of live instruments such as cello, guitar, and drums. Raime also recorded more traditional industrial sounds, which included field recordings in warehouses and under railway arches. The duo noted that it was important for them to not use any pre-recorded sounds to make the album sound raw and unpredictable.

After they finished the recording process, the duo would meet in their home studio, where they would spend hours listening to all the recorded material and compiling it into the album's tracks. Joe Andrews combined working on the album with his full-time job at a record distributors. In an interview with The Guardian he expands on his daily routine during the album's recording:

Reception

Quarter Turns over a Living Line received positive reviews from music critics. At Metacritic, which assigns a normalized rating out of 100 to reviews from mainstream publications, the album received an average score of 82, based on 11 reviews. According to AllMusic, the album was a "remarkable success" that "saw [the band] break out of the underground to become firm mainstream favorites". Following the album's success, the duo started touring and performing worldwide.

Aneet Nijjar of AllMusic praised the album, calling it "the sound of shadows lurking, the sound of a thousand crashing cars, the sound of flesh ripping on steel", while also commending unusual for the genre use of live instruments. Vincent Pollard of Exclaim! called it an "astonishing album" which stands alone from anything else released that year and a "terrifying journey". Steve Shaw, writing for Fact magazine, said that Quarter Turns over a Living Line is "both powerful in its execution of an idea, but also quite sure of its own modest signature" and that its sound separates it from other industrial and drone albums. Pitchforks Nick Neyland wrote that "the seven tracks here have the cold ripple of alienation and abandon pulsing through them" and called it a "logical endpoint for dubstep", reminiscent of post-rock. Harry Sword of The Quietus described the album as "a slow journey inwards" into "ever darker and transcendent spaces". Resident Advisors Angus Finlayson, comparing the album to the duo's previous work, called it "more expansive, more ambitious and more accomplished", complimenting the use of live instruments and the change of pace. Tiny Mix Tapes praised the album and its "broadening of musical depth", along with the album's use of live instruments and its "shadowed and daunting environment".

Accolades
Several publications included Quarter Turns over a Living Line in their lists of the best albums of 2012. It appeared on Tiny Mix Tapes list at number 49, Resident Advisors list at number 20, The Quietuss list at number 32, and The Wires list at number 38.

Track listing

Personnel
Credits are adapted from the album's liner notes.

 Tom Halstead – songwriting, production
 Joe Andrews – songwriting, production
 Celia Sadie – cello
 Amy Hurst – drums
 Valentina Magaletti – drums
 Matt Colton – mastering
 Rosie Terry – photography
 William Oliver – photography
 Oliver Smith – design

References

External links
 

2012 albums
Experimental music albums by British artists
Drone music albums by British artists
Dark ambient albums
Ambient albums by British artists